Moakler is a surname. Notable people with the surname include:

 Shanna Moakler (born 1975), American model and actress
 Steve Moakler (born 1988), American country musician and songwriter

See also
 Moakley